Dobřichovice is a town in Prague-West District in the Central Bohemian Region of the Czech Republic. It has about 3,700 inhabitants.

Geography

It lies on both banks of the river Berounka. The northern part of the municipal territory is located in the Hořovice Uplands, the southern part in the Brdy Highlands.

Climate
2012 saw the nation's highest ever recorded temperature in the town, with the heat registering  on 20 August.

History
The first written mention of Dobřichovice is from 1253, when it was donated to Knights of the Cross with the Red Star. With short breaks it was owned by this order throughout its existence. Dobřichovice Castle was built in the 16th century and rebuilt after a fire in 1779.

Due to its location, Dobřichovice often suffers from floods, the most destructive of which were in 1872, 1941 and 1947. Dobřichovice was  also affected by 2002 European floods and more than 200 houses were severely damaged up to the ground floor. The flood also destroyed a 30-year-old footbridge which has since been replaced by a new one.

In 1876, Dobřichovice was promoted to a market town. Dobřichovice was proclaimed a town in 2006.

Transport
The Prague–Dobřichovice–Beroun railway line is situated on the right bank of the Berounka river and has a stop in Dobřichovice.

Sights

The Dobřichovice Castle retains its Baroque appearance from the 18th century. The castle Chapel of Saint Jude the Apostle next to the castle was built in 1679. Until 1948, the castle served as a summer residence of the grand masters of Knights of the Cross with the Red Star. Today it is owned again by the order and inaccessible to the public.

Notable people
Ludvík Vaculík (1926–2015), writer; lived and died here
Lenka Kotková (born 1973), astronomer

Twin towns – sister cities

Dobřichovice is twinned with:
 Villieu-Loyes-Mollon, France (2002)
 Manhattan, United States (2006)

References

External links

Populated places in Prague-West District
Cities and towns in the Czech Republic